The Colorado Mammoth are a lacrosse team based in Denver, Colorado playing in the National Lacrosse League (NLL). The 2013 season was the 27th in franchise history and 11th as the Mammoth (previously the Washington Power, Pittsburgh Crossefire, and Baltimore Thunder).

The Mammoth survived a 2-7 start to the season, finishing strong and ending up at 7-9, good for 4th place in the West. But for the third straight year, they were ousted in the first round of the playoffs, this time by the Calgary Roughnecks, 15-10.

Regular season

Conference standings

Game log
Reference:

Playoffs

Game log

Roster

Transactions

Trades

Entry Draft
The 2012 NLL Entry Draft took place on October 1, 2012. The Mammoth made the following selections:

See also
2013 NLL season

References

Colorado
Colorado Mammoth seasons
Colorado Mammoth